The third season of the Russian reality talent show The Voice Senior (The Voice. 60+) premiered on September 4, 2020 on Channel One. Lev Leshchenko returned as coach, while Tamara Gverdtsiteli, Elena Vaenga, and Garik Sukachov replaced Pelageya, Valeriya, and Mikhail Boyarsky, respectively. Dmitry Nagiev returned as the show's presenter.

Dina Yudina was announced the winner on October 2, 2020, marking Tamara Gverdtsiteli's first win as a coach and the second female coach to win in the show's history, behind Pelageya. With Dina's win, Tamara Gverdtsiteli became the first new coach to win. Also, Dina became only the 2nd winner in the show’s history to have been just a one-chair turn in the blind auditions.

Coaches and presenter

Lev Leshchenko returned as coaches for his 3rd season in a row. Pelageya, Valeriya, and Boyarsky didn't return for season three and were replaced by Tamara Gverdtsiteli, Elena Vaenga, and Garik Sukachov, thus making it the second season (and the third season in the whole Russian version of The Voice franchise) to have two female coaches.

Dmitry Nagiev returned as a presenter.

Teams
Colour key

Blind auditions
Colour key

The coaches performed "Я милого узнаю по походке" at the start of the show.

The Knockouts

Final
Colour key

Best Coach
Colour key

Reception

Rating

Notes

References

2020 Russian television seasons